Anania perlucidalis, the fenland pearl, is a species of moth of the family Crambidae. It was described by Jacob Hübner in 1809 and is found in Europe.

The moth flies from June to August depending on the location.

The larvae feed on Cirsium oleraceum and other Cirsium species.

References

External links 
 Waarneming.nl 
 Lepidoptera of Belgium
 Phlyctaenia perlucidalis at UKMoths

Pyraustinae
Moths of Europe
Moths described in 1809